The meaning of Pravin in the Sanskrit language is "skilled" or "talented." It is most often a male name and a given name, and less commonly a surname. 

It may refer to:
Pravin Rai Mahal, palace in Madhya Pradesh

Notable people
Pravin Tambe, Indian cricketer
Pravin Hansraj, Indian cricketer	
Pravin Tarde, Indian film director
Pravin Darekar, Indian politician
Pravin Gordhan, South African politician 
Pravin Amre, Indian cricketer
Pravin Bhatt, Indian film cinematographer, director and screenwriter
Pravin Arlekar, Indian politician 
Pravin Joshi, Indian stage actor and director. He was a leading figure of the commercial Gujarati theatre in the...
Pravin Togadia, Indian doctor, cancer surgeon and an advocate for Hindu nationalism...
Pravin Mani, Indian musician
Pravin Rathod, Indian politician 
Pravin Godkhindi, Indian classical Hindustani flute (bansuri) player
Pravin Datke, Indian politician 
Pravin Naik, Indian politician 
Pravin Mishra, Indian filmmaker, painter, and newspaper columnist
Pravin Makadiya, Indian politician 
Pravin Thipsay, Indian chess player
Pravin Varaiya, Indian-American academic
Pravin Krishna, Indian-American academic
Pravin Pote, (P.R.Pote Patil),  Indian politician
Pravin Jadhav, Indian archer 
Pravin Guanasagaran, Singaporean footballer
Pravin Darji, Indian essayist, poet, critic and editor 
Pravin Dubey, Indian cricketer 
Pravin Patkar, Indian academic and human rights activist
Pravin Singh, Fijian politician of Indian descent

See also
Praveen